Wilhelm Heinrich Riehl (6 May 1823 – 16 November 1897) was a German journalist, novelist and folklorist.

Riehl was born in Biebrich in the Duchy of Nassau and died in Munich. Riehl was born into a settled middle-class background, was a professor at the University of Munich, and later in life a curator of Bavarian antiquities.

According to George Mosse,

"Riehl's writings became normative for a large body of Volkish thought...he constructed a more completely integrated Volkish view of man and society as they related to nature, history, and landscape....in his famous Land und Leute (Land and People), written in 1857–63," which "discussed the organic nature of a Volk which he claimed could only be attained if it fused with the native landscape....Riehl rejected all artificiality and defined modernity as a nature contrived by man and thus devoid of that genuineness to which living nature alone gives meaning...Riehl pointed to the newly developing urban centers as the cause of social unrest and the democratic upsurge of 1848 in Hessia"....for many "subsequent Volkish thinkers, only nature was genuine."

"Riehl desired a hierarchical society that patterned after the medieval estates. In Die bürgerliche Gesellschaft (Bourgeois Society) he accused those of Capitalist interest of "disturbing ancient customs and thus destroying the historicity of the Volk."

Riehl argued that the 'working class' were the most respectable Volk, since they were best attuned to nature itself. Throughout his work, Riehl displays a strong conviction that the German people and land are intrinsically connected to one another. He also is considered the founder of the "German ethnographic Volkskunde" and drew many of his conclusions in his work from his personal experiences hiking throughout Germany.

References

Bibliography
 George Peabody Gooch History and Historians in the Nineteenth Century (1913), https://archive.org/details/a583266900goocuoft
 Liulevicius, Vejas G. War Land on the Eastern Front: Culture, National Identity and German Occupation in World War I. Cambridge: Cambridge University Press, 2004.
 Mosse, George L. The Crisis of German Ideology: Intellectual Origins of the Third Reich. New York: Grosset & Dunlap, 1964.

External links 

 
 
 Der vereinzelte Großstädter

1823 births
1897 deaths
German folklorists
German journalists
German male journalists
People from Wiesbaden
People from the Duchy of Nassau
Burials at the Alter Nordfriedhof (Munich)
19th-century German journalists
German male novelists
19th-century German novelists
19th-century German male writers